Ried is a municipality in the district of Aichach-Friedberg in Bavaria in Germany.

References

Aichach-Friedberg